Imantocera is a genus of longhorn beetles of the subfamily Lamiinae, containing the following species:

 Imantocera arenosa Pascoe, 1862
 Imantocera grisescens Dillon & Dillon, 1951
 Imantocera mindanaonis Breuning, 1980
 Imantocera niasensis Breuning, 1936
 Imantocera penicillata (Hope, 1831)
 Imantocera plumosa (Olivier, 1792)
 Imantocera sumbawana Breuning, 1947
 Imantocera vicina Gahan, 1895

References

Lamiini